The British music charts are compiled by the Official Charts Company to measure sales of recorded music on compact disc and digital download. From 6 July, video streaming was included into the charts.

Charts and sales

Number-one singles
The singles chart includes a proportion for streaming.

Number-one albums
The albums chart includes a proportion for streaming.

Number-one compilation albums

Top singles of the year
This chart was published by the Official Charts Company in January 2019

Notes:

Best-selling albums

Notes:

See also 
 List of number-one singles from 2010
 List of number-one albums from 2010
 List of UK top-ten singles in 2018
 2010s in music
 List of 2018 albums
 2018 in British television

References 

 
United Kingdom
British record charts